Irene Robles Aldana (born March 26, 1988) is a Mexican professional mixed martial artist. She currently competes in the Women’s Bantamweight division in the Ultimate Fighting Championship (UFC). As of January 17 2023, she is #5 in the UFC women's bantamweight rankings.

Background
Aldana graduated from college with a degree in graphic design. During her college studies, she grew an interest in mixed martial arts and started training at local Lobo Gym.

Mixed martial arts career

Jungle Fight
In her lone fight with Brazilian mixed martial arts promotion Jungle Fight, Aldana faced Larissa Pacheco for the vacant JF Women's Bantamweight Championship at JF: Jungle Fight 63 on December 21, 2013. She lost the fight via third-round TKO, giving her the first loss of her professional career.

Invicta Fighting Championships
Aldana signed with Invicta FC in mid-2014, and made her debut against Peggy Morgan at Invicta FC 8: Waterson vs. Tamada on September 9, 2014, submitting Morgan with a rear-naked choke in the first round.

She was then expected to face Marion Reneau at Invicta FC 10: Waterson vs. Tiburcio on December 5, 2014, but Aldana was forced out of the bout due to an illness and the fight was taken off the card.

Aldana was scheduled to face Melanie LaCroix at Invicta FC 11: Cyborg vs. Tweet on February 27, 2015, however, LaCroix withdrew from the bout for undisclosed reasons and was replaced by promotional newcomer Colleen Schneider. She won the fight via first round rear-naked choke.

Ultimate Fighting Championship
On November 6, 2016, it was announced that Aldana was signed to the UFC and would face Leslie Smith on December 17, 2016 at UFC on Fox 22. Aldana lost the fight by unanimous decision. Despite the loss, the bout earned Aldana her first Fight of the Night bonus award in the UFC.

Aldana faced Talita Bernardo on January 14, 2018 at UFC Fight Night: Stephens vs. Choi. Aldana won the fight via unanimous decision.

Aldana was scheduled to face Bethe Correia on August 4, 2018, at UFC 227; however, the bout was pulled when Correia withdrew due to injury. Instead, Aldana faced Lucie Pudilová on September 8, 2018, at UFC 228, winning a close fight via split decision and earning her and Pudilová Fight of the Night award.

Her bout with Bethe Correia was rescheduled and is expected to take place on May 11, 2019 at UFC 237. At the weigh-ins, Correia weighed in at 141 lbs, 5 pounds over the bantamweight limit of 136 lbs. She was fined 30% of her fight purse and the bout proceeded at catchweight.  Aldana won the fight via submission in round three.

Aldana faced Raquel Pennington on July 20, 2019 at UFC on ESPN 4. Aldana lost the fight via split decision.

Aldana was scheduled to face Marion Reneau on September 21, 2019 at UFC on ESPN+ 17. However, Reneau pulled out of the bout on September 11 for undisclosed reasons. Reneau was replaced by promotional newcomer Vanessa Melo. At the weigh-ins, Melo weighed in at 140 pounds, 4 pounds over the bantamweight non-title fight limit of 136. She was fined 30% of her purse and her bout with Aldana proceeded at a catchweight. Aldana won the fight by unanimous decision.

Aldana faced Ketlen Vieira on December 14, 2019 at UFC 245. Aldana won the fight via knockout in round one.  This win earned her the Performance of the Night award.

Aldana was scheduled to face Holly Holm on August 1, 2020 at UFC Fight Night 173. However, it was reported on July 22 that Aldana pulled out of the fight for undisclosed reasons. Mere hours after the news surfaced, Aldana revealed that the reason for withdrawal was testing positive for COVID-19. As a result, Holm was removed from the card as well and the pairing was left intact and rescheduled for October 4, 2020 at UFC on ESPN: Holm vs. Aldana. Aldana lost the fight via unanimous decision.

Aldana faced Yana Kunitskaya on July 10, 2021 at UFC 264. At the weigh-ins, Aldana weighed in at 139.5 pounds, three and a half pounds over the bantamweight non-title fight limit. Her bout is expected to proceed at catchweight and she will be fined 30% of her purse, which will go to her opponent Kunitskaya. Aldana won the fight via technical knockout in round one.

Aldana was next expected to face Germaine de Randamie at UFC 268 in New York, NY.  However, de Randamie withdrew in early September due to injury.

Aldana was scheduled to face Aspen Ladd on April 9, 2022 at UFC 273. However, Aldana withdrew in late March for unknown reasons and was replaced by former UFC Women's Bantamweight Championship challenger Raquel Pennington.

Aldana faced Macy Chiasson on September 10, 2022 at UFC 279. She won the fight via knockout in the third round via an upkick to Chaisson's body. The win earned Aldana her second Performance of the Night bonus award.

Aldana is scheduled to face Raquel Pennington on March 25, 2023, at UFC on ESPN 43.

Championships and accomplishments
 Ultimate Fighting Championship
 Fight of the Night (Two time)  vs. Leslie Smith and Lucie Pudilová
Performance of the Night (Two times) 
 Invicta Fighting Championships
 Performance of the Night (three times) vs. Peggy Morgan, Colleen Schneider, and Faith Van Duin
MMAJunkie.com
2019 December Knockout of the Month

Mixed martial arts record

|-
|Win
|align=center|14–6
|Macy Chiasson
|KO (upkick to the body)
|UFC 279
|
|align=center|3
|align=center|2:21
|Las Vegas, Nevada, United States
|
|-
|Win
|align=center|13–6
|Yana Kunitskaya
|TKO (punches)
|UFC 264 
|
|align=center|1
|align=center|4:35
|Las Vegas, Nevada, United States
|
|-
|Loss
|align=center|12–6
|Holly Holm
|Decision (unanimous)
|UFC on ESPN: Holm vs. Aldana
|
|align=center|5
|align=center|5:00
|Abu Dhabi, United Arab Emirates
|
|-
|Win
|align=center|12–5
|Ketlen Vieira
|KO (punches)
|UFC 245 
|
|align=center|1
|align=center|4:51
|Las Vegas, Nevada, United States
|
|-
|Win
|align=center|11–5
|Vanessa Melo
|Decision (unanimous)
|UFC Fight Night: Rodríguez vs. Stephens 
|
|align=center|3
|align=center|5:00
|Mexico City, Mexico
|
|-
|Loss
|align=center|10–5
|Raquel Pennington
|Decision (split)
|UFC on ESPN: dos Anjos vs. Edwards 
|
|align=center|3
|align=center|5:00
|San Antonio, Texas, United States
|
|- 
|Win
|align=center|10–4
|Bethe Correia
|Submission (armbar)
|UFC 237
|
|align=center|3
|align=center|3:24
|Rio de Janeiro, Brazil
|
|-
|Win
|align=center|9–4
|Lucie Pudilová
|Decision (split)
|UFC 228
|
|align=center|3
|align=center|5:00
|Dallas, Texas, United States
|
|-
|Win
|align=center|8–4
|Talita Bernardo
|Decision (unanimous)
|UFC Fight Night: Stephens vs. Choi
|
|align=center|3
|align=center|5:00
|St. Louis, Missouri, United States
|
|-
|Loss
|align=center|7–4
|Katlyn Chookagian
|Decision (split)
|UFC 210
|
|align=center|3
|align=center|5:00
|Buffalo, New York, United States
|
|-
|Loss
|align=center|7–3
|Leslie Smith
|Decision (unanimous)
|UFC on Fox: VanZant vs. Waterson
|
|align=center|3
|align=center|5:00
|Sacramento, California, United States
|
|-
| Win
| align=center|7–2
| Faith Van Duin
| TKO (punches)
| Invicta FC 19: Maia vs. Modafferi
| 
| align=center| 1
| align=center| 4:57
| Kansas City, Missouri, United States
| 
|-
| Win
| align=center|6–2
| Jessamyn Duke
| TKO (punches)
| Invicta FC 16: Hamasaki vs. Brown
| 
| align=center| 1
| align=center| 3:08
| Las Vegas, Nevada, United States
|
|-
| Loss
| align=center|5–2
| Tonya Evinger
| TKO (punches)
| Invicta FC 13: Cyborg vs. Van Duin
| 
| align=center| 4
| align=center| 4:38
| Las Vegas, Nevada, United States
| 
|-
|Win
|align=center|5–1
|Colleen Schneider
|Submission (rear-naked choke)
|Invicta FC 11: Cyborg vs. Tweet
|
|align=center|1
|align=center|1:05
|Los Angeles, California, United States
| 
|-
|Win
|align=center|4–1
|Peggy Morgan
|Submission (rear-naked choke)
|Invicta FC 8: Waterson vs. Tamada
|
|align=center|1
|align=center|2:50
|Kansas City, Missouri, United States
| 
|-
|Loss
|align=center|3–1
|Larissa Pacheco
|TKO (punches)
|Jungle Fight 63
|
|align=center| 3
|align=center| 1:50
|Belém, Brazil
|
|-
|Win
|align=center|3–0
|Mayra Arce
|KO (spinning wheel kick and punches)
|Xtreme Kombat 21
|
|align=center|1
|align=center|0:43
|Mexico City, Mexico
|
|-
|Win
|align=center|2–0
|Flor Saenz
|TKO (knee to the body)
|Xtreme Kombat 21
|
|align=center|1
|align=center|0:20
|Mexico City, Mexico
|
|-
|Win
|align=center|1–0
|Sandra del Rincon
|KO (knees and punches)
|GEX - Old Jack's Fight Night
|
|align=center|1
|align=center|0:15
|Zapopan, Mexico
|
|-

See also
 List of current UFC fighters
 List of female mixed martial artists

References

External links
 
 

1988 births
Living people
Mexican female mixed martial artists
Bantamweight mixed martial artists
Ultimate Fighting Championship female fighters
Sportspeople from Culiacán